Trinity College is an independent day school for boys, located on the Swan River foreshore in East Perth, Western Australia. The school was established in 1962 when students from the city schools CBC Perth and St Patrick's Boys School moved to the new Trinity College campus.

Trinity College is commonly shortened to Trinity or TC. Former students of Trinity are called Trinity Old Boys. Trinity is a school in the Edmund Rice tradition promoting classic and modern education, culture, dance, drama, music, service to others, spirituality, sport, and vocation. Trinity comprises an East Perth campus with a junior school for years 4 to 6, a middle school for years 7 to 8, and a senior school for years 9 to 12; an outdoor education wilderness at Camp Kelly Dwellingup; and sporting grounds at Waterford.

History

CBC Perth and St Patrick's Boys School

CBC Perth was founded in 1894 by Bishop Matthew Gibney, Brother Ambrose Treacy, and the Congregation of Christian Brothers. The college was the second high school built in Western Australia. It was located in the heart of Perth on the corner of Victoria Avenue and St Georges Terrace.

In 1938, the boarding school and some day boys moved to the new school at Aquinas College, Salter Point. Aquinas inherited the school colours red and black, the school crest and motto, the honour boards, and the school PSA membership and achievements. The new campus at Aquinas depleted student numbers at CBC Perth. Nearby, St Patrick's, a Christian Brothers school in the city on the corner of Wellington and Lord Streets, was overflowing. Many students transferred from St Patrick's, and CBC Perth continued as a day school from 1938. Stripped of its history, traditions and students, CBC Perth raised new honour boards and the colours blue, light blue and green, and the college set about claiming a new heritage which 24 years later would become Trinity College.

When Perth won the right to host the 1962 British Empire and Commonwealth Games, the City of Perth negotiated with the Christian Brothers from 1958–1960 to purchase CBC Perth for £267,000, in order to widen St Georges Terrace and to construct a new hotel. The Chevron-Hilton Hotel Group which had committed to the development, ran into difficulties, and the school buildings remained until demolition in the mid-1960s. The site was vacant until the Australian Taxation Office building was built there several years later. The building is now the Duxton Hotel. The council provided a  site for the new college on reclaimed land in East Perth on the banks of the Swan River, next to the WACA Ground, Gloucester Park, and The Causeway.

Brother J.A.Kelly, headmaster of CBC Perth, and architect Jim Henderson fast tracked construction of Trinity College from 1960 to ensure the college opened in time for the 1962 school year. Even with the pressing deadline, Brother Kelly was instrumental in building the imaginative round chapel at Trinity, and he commissioned Ted Gowers to design the stained glass windows set in concrete. At the time, this was the largest work of art undertaken in the post-war years of Western Australia. Brother Kelly also commissioned artist Margaret Priest to design and make abstract statues of the Sacred Heart of Jesus, the Blessed Virgin Mary, the Crucifix, and the fourteen Stations of the Cross.

By the end of 1961, Trinity College was nearing completion. CBC Perth closed and when St Patrick's closed two years later the two schools became one.

Trinity
In 1962, Trinity opened as a day school with 830 boys. The official opening was held on 25 March 1962. The school had a new crest and motto, and retained the colours and the honour boards of CBC Perth which were raised in 1938. Trinity dominated Association Catholic Colleges sporting events. In 1968, Trinity joined the PSA and the manful rivalry with Aquinas, the old foe, entered a level playing field. In 1972, Trinity won the PSA athletics carnival ending a seven-year winning streak by Aquinas. In the years ahead, coaches and students at Aquinas responded with the call, "Beat Trinity!"

Campus
The college has undergone significant expansion. The original 1962 buildings included Trinity Chapel, A and B blocks, Gibney Hall, the pavilion, a squash and handball court (both demolished late 1999), and the Brothers' Monastery (rebuilt into the Junior School in 1991). In 1983, Gibney Hall was widened, by bricking-in the balcony on the western side, and lengthened to accommodate all students and staff at assemblies. Over the years the college has expanded to include Kelly Senior School 1968, Duffy Library 1979, admin block 1981, Foley Physical Education Centre 1992, Treacy Design and Technology Centre 2001, Brockwell Observatory 2001, Curtis Aquatic Centre 2004, and O'Doherty Cultural Education Centre 2010.

Principals

Brother Kelly was the last headmaster of CBC Perth and the founding headmaster of Trinity College. He was headmaster during 1962-1966 and he returned again as headmaster during 1978–1984. Four Christian Brothers served as headmaster of the college. Over the years, lay teachers gradually replaced Christian Brothers on staff. In 1994, Anthony Curtis was appointed the first lay principal (name changed from headmaster to principal). Shortly after his retirement the school aquatic complex was named in his honour.

Academic ranking, Western Australia

WA school ATAR ranking

Year 12 student achievement data

Beazley Medal

2011: Calum Braham won the Beazley Medal for the top ranked WACE student.

John Curtin Scholarship

2013: Roberto Di Giovanni received a John Curtin Scholarship from Curtin University. The Scholarship is the most generous and prestigious undergraduate scholarship offered by the university.

2016: Jed Herne received a John Curtin Scholarship from Curtin University. The scholarship is the most generous and prestigious undergraduate scholarship offered by the university.

UWA Fogarty Scholarship

2016: James Heald was awarded the UWA Fogarty Scholarship which is based on academic excellence and outstanding achievements in at least three of four categories: leadership, community involvement, the arts and sport.

Sport
Trinity joined the PSA in 1968 and since 1969 Trinity has competed in all PSA sports. It is compulsory for each student to compete in a summer and a winter sport. In football, Trinity students typically do not compete for selection for the Western Australian Football League colts or for Teal Cup teams. This does not hamper future selection opportunities for students. Many students have been selected in the Australian Football League national draft based on their performance in the PSA. The sporting skills, coaching, fitness and organisation of students from the seven PSA schools is commensurable to the highest levels offered by any schoolboy competition in Western Australia. This is evident by the number of former PSA students who compete in their chosen sports at state, national, international, and Olympic levels.

As the most recent school in the PSA, Trinity has improved over time and the college has moved up the ranks in most sports. The most notable exception is swimming.

The main campus at East Perth has one oval which prior to the EPRA land-swap catered for a turf cricket ground in summer, a football oval in winter, and an athletics training track in spring. There are four outdoor hardcourts marked for tennis and basketball. The campus has a 50m swimming pool and a gymnasium which is marked with basketball, volleyball, and badminton courts. As well, the school has a rowing boathouse on the East Perth foreshore. Courses along Heirisson Island, the Swan River foreshore, and Kings Park including Jacobs Ladder provide excellent cross-country tracks. The East Perth campus lacks dedicated facilities for hockey, rugby and soccer. At various times the college has sought to purchase the land between the college and the Causeway, as well as vacant land on the north side of Gloucester Park. Negotiations for these purchases with the City of Perth have repeatedly fallen through due to town planning intentions. However, the City of Perth has allowed the college to use facilities at Haig Park, which has now been redeveloped by EPRA, and to use facilities at Langley Park and Wellington Square.

The Waterford playing fields have five cricket ovals, three turfed and two synthetic pitches. Two turfed pitch ovals become football ovals in winter and the remaining pitches separate into two soccer fields, two hockey fields and one rugby field.

The senior school holds official college trials and championships for swimming and athletics. Students who advance from the trials compete against each other in the college championships to decide school champions and to decide who qualifies for events on the school teams. Summer and winter team sports hold similar selection procedures relevant to the criteria set-down by each code. College champions for summer and winter team sports are chosen by judging committees who award points for a player's performance for each official PSA fixture. In addition, the college has three major sports awards. The J P Ilich Award for outstanding service to the school in sport, and the Old Boys Awards for the students who score the most points for Trinity at PSA athletics and swimming carnivals.

PSA premierships 
Trinity has won the following PSA premierships.

 Athletics (10) – 1972, 1985, 1988, 1989, 1990, 1991, 2004, 2005, 2006, 2010
 Basketball (8) – 1987, 1992, 2007, 2009, 2010, 2011, 2014, 2016
 Cricket (7) – 1975, 1980, 1985, 2005, 2007, 2010, 2020 (Shared with Hale School due to COVID-19)
 Cross Country (10) – 1990, 1991, 2002, 2003, 2004, 2007, 2008, 2009, 2010, 2016
 Football (10) – 1974, 1976, 1983, 1997, 1998, 2003, 2004, 2005, 2006, 2007
 Golf (2) – 2019, 2020
 Hockey (7) – 1982, 1987, 1988, 1989, 1991, 1992, 1993
 Rowing (15) – 2002, 2003, 2004, 2007, 2008, 2010, 2011, 2012, 2015, 2016, 2017, 2019, 2021, 2022, 2023
 Rugby (9) – 1991, 1992, 1993, 1994, 1995, 1996, 1997, 1998, 2002
 Soccer (14) – 1987, 1988, 1989, 1990, 1991, 1992, 1993, 1995, 2000, 2001, 2007, 2008, 2012, 2015
 Swimming – 2007
 Tennis (4) – 1974, 1984, 1988, 1989
 Volleyball (6) – 2009, 2010, 2013, 2014, 2015, 2016
 Water Polo – 2013

School houses
Trinity inherited a four house system from CBC Perth. Each house has a major and a minor colour, a motto and an emblem. Each classroom stream is divided into one of the four houses. Siblings and cousins belong to the house of their eldest relative. When played, competitions are held to decide the House Champion. Currently, the house system is the format for carnival competitions held within the junior school.

In 1979 the senior school replaced the four house system with a three carnival competition, House of Cards, held by students in the same year. Two carnivals, swimming and athletics, are called the Bowers, and the third carnival, cross-country, is called the Sevens. Teams are the same as the home-room class. In the lead up to the swimming and athletics carnivals, each home-room class holds an impromptu meeting to decide the Jack (class captain) and the Dealer (class selector). The tactics of the Dealer are the key to winning a Bowers carnival. Each student must compete in one of the race divisions for each event and the line-ups must be submitted before a Bowers carnival begins. Each race division awards the same points descending from first to last. Calculations using intelligence gathering and misinformation are required to work out the best order to race classmates. One important play is the Jack who is awarded maximum points regardless of where he finishes in a race. Cheating is a permitted tactic. A cheat stands and points awarded if no appeal is made to the carnival judge before the end of a race. If an appeal for cheating is upheld, the cheater forfeits points earned from the race. The winning team is the class which out-trumps the other classes by setting up the most favourable mis-matches in order to score the most points. The cross-country carnival, called the Sevens, is pure in format. No cheats are permitted and the carnival judge may order a cheater to wear a smock-of-shame for a day. The winning team is the first to have seven classmates cross the finishing line. However, there is one important exception. The team with the last seven to cross the finishing line automatically loses. The carnivals may be used for fundraising and nominal wagers by each competitor are put into a kitty. The winning team for each carnival is awarded the right to choose an approved cause to donate the kitty.

School hymn
The title of the school hymn, "In Nomine Domini", is derived from the school motto and Psalm 123: adjutorium nostrum in Nomine Domini, "Our help is in the name of the Lord." The hymn was written in 1979 by Father Paul Keyte, the school chaplain at the time. Inspired by the Harrow School Song "Forty Years On", Father Keyte wrote in the 1979 School Annual, he was not merely trying to write a hymn but an anthem and something that, "would not only renew loyalty to the school but would also rekindle the flame of faith". The music was written by Brother Gerald Crooks, a long serving music teacher at the college. In 1984, Brother Crooks introduced a brass fanfare lead featuring trumpets and trombones. "In Nomine Domine" is sung at Speech Nights, Year 12 Graduations, Anzac Day ceremonies, and at PSA sporting events.

International achievements
International Mathematical Modeling Challenge 2016

The team from Trinity won the Meritous Award – the second highest award category – at the International Mathematical Modeling Challenge (IM2C). The team was judged by the IM2C international panel against solutions from a pool of 40 teams from 23 countries.

World Schools Cross-Country Championships 2008

In 2007, the Trinity cross-country team competed at the Telstra National All-Schools Cross Country Championships held in Perth, Western Australia. Trinity won the overall schools championships and the team was chosen to represent Australia. In 2008, the team finished 6th at the World Schools Cross-Country Championships held in the Czech Republic. The equal highest position by an Australian school.

F1 in Schools World Championships 2007

Trinity students were awarded Best Engineered Car at the F1 in Schools World Championships held in Melbourne.

Sexual abuse 
In November 2020 two former teachers were convicted of failing to report suspected child sexual abuse. The incident occurred on a Trinity rugby trip to Japan in 2017. The teachers, Ian Francis Hailes and Anthony Paul Webb, were said to be the first people convicted under WA's mandatory reporting of sexual abuse laws.

The alleged victim told a court he was bullied throughout the trip including being forced face-down onto a bed by Trinity teammates, his pants pulled down and sexually assaulted with a carrot. The alleged victim said the incident was raised at a "fines session".

The court found the teachers formed a reasonable belief on the rugby tour that sexual abuse might have occurred, but did not report it, as required by law.

Notable alumni 

An alumnus of Trinity College is called a Trinity Old Boy.  Notable Old Boys include:

 Jeremy Allanson – Justice of the Supreme Court of Western Australia
 Warren Anderson – businessman
 Michael Brennan – AFL football player, West Coast Eagles
 Beau Casson – Test cricketer
 Ben Cureton – world champion rower
 Mitch Duncan – Australian Football League player, Geelong Football Club
 Michael Edgley – entertainment entrepreneur
 Herb Elliott AC – Chair Fortescue Metals Group, Olympic athletic champion
 Chris Ellison – Cabinet minister
 Andrew Embley – AFL football player, West Coast Eagles
 Dave Faulkner – musician, Hoodoo Gurus
 William Foley – Archbishop of Perth
 Denis Horgan – vigneron Leeuwin Estate, co-founder Notre Dame University WA
 Simon Katich – Test cricketer
 Shaun Murphy – international football player, Socceroos
 Ray O'Connor – Premier of Western Australia
 Alex Rullo – racing car driver
 Shiny Joe Ryan – musician, Pond
 Craig Serjeant – Test cricketer
 John Steffensen – Olympic athlete
 Henk Vogels Jr – Olympic & Tour de France cyclist
 Brandon Starcevich – AFL football player, Brisbane Lions

 Nic Martin- AFL footballer

Gallery

See also 

 Catholic education in Australia
 List of schools in Perth, Western Australia

References

External links

 

 
1962 establishments in Australia